Westermost Rough may refer to:

A region of the North Sea
A wind farm in the North Sea, Westermost Rough wind farm